Pərvanlı (also, Pervanly) is a village and municipality in the Zardab Rayon of Azerbaijan.  It has a population of 1,301.

See also 
Administrative divisions of Azerbaijan

References 

Populated places in Zardab District